Nicole Luiken (born May 25, 1971, in Manning, Alberta) is a Canadian science fiction and speculative fiction author of novels for teens and adults. She worked as a librarian for several years before giving it up to write full-time. She currently lives in Edmonton, Alberta with her husband Aaron and sons Simon and Luke. She had published her first two novels by the time she was in grade 11. Nicole's novel Unlocking the Doors won her a YTV Achievement Award for writing in 1989.

Young adult novels
Unlocking the Doors (Scholastic, 1988)
Escape to the Overworlds (Treefrog, 1988)
Catalyst (Treefrog, 1989)
Violet Eyes (Pocket, 2001)
Silver Eyes (Pocket, 2001)
Frost (Great Plains, 2007)
Dreamfire (Great Plains, 2009)
Dreamline (Great Plains, 2011)
Angel Eyes (self-published, 2013)
Golden Eyes (2016)

Adult novels
Running on Instinct (Tor, 2001; writing as N. M. Luiken)
Gate to Kandrith (ebook, Carina Press, 2012)
Soul of Kandrith (ebook, Carina Press, 2013)

Forthcoming books
Besieged by Demons (Harlequin Reckonings, release date unknown)

References

http://www.facebook.com/pages/Nicole-Luiken/50793836133?ref=ts
https://web.archive.org/web/20120301035507/http://www.umanitoba.ca/cm/profiles/luiken.html

External links

1971 births
Living people
Canadian science fiction writers
Canadian children's writers
Women science fiction and fantasy writers
Canadian women children's writers
People from Manning, Alberta